Nigel George Planer (born 22 February 1953) is a British actor, writer and musician. He played Neil in the BBC comedy The Young Ones and Ralph Filthy in Filthy Rich & Catflap. He has appeared in many West End musicals, including original casts of Evita, Chicago, We Will Rock You, Wicked, and Charlie and the Chocolate Factory. He has also appeared in Hairspray. He won a BRIT award in 1984 and has been nominated for Olivier, TMA, WhatsOnStage and BAFTA awards.

Early life
Planer's father's Hungarian-Romanian family left Germany in 1933 and settled in Mortlake, London. He established a company, which pioneered technology in controlled-rate freezers, IVF and stem cell research. Nigel has two brothers, and attended King's House School in Richmond and Westminster School in central London, where he wrote a satirical play about the school with fellow pupil Stephen Poliakoff. He began a degree course in African and Asian Studies at the University of Sussex, but dropped out to study acting at the London Academy of Music and Dramatic Art.

Career
Planer was a founding member of the London Comedy Store and The Comic Strip – pioneers of the alternative comedy movement in the United Kingdom. Planer appeared with Peter Richardson as part of the double act "The Outer Limits". Planer and Richardson also wrote the That's Life! parody on Not the Nine O'Clock News. With Christopher Douglas, he created the spoof actor character "Nicholas Craig", who appears in book, radio, TV and articles as well as live; including, in 2011, in Stewart Lee's At Last! The 1981 Show at the Royal Festival Hall, London, and in 2022 in Nicholas Craig's Podcom. Planer is also the author of several books, plays, radio plays, and TV scripts as well as a small volume of poetry. He was awarded an Honorary Doctor of Arts degree from Edinburgh Napier University in June 2011.

Television
Planer is best known for his role as Neil, the hippie housemate in the BBC comedy The Young Ones, which ran for two series broadcast in 1982 and 1984. He has starred in The Comic Strip Presents..., a series of short films broadcast from 1982 onwards, on Channel 4. 

In 2003, Planer played Professor Dumbledore in a Harry Potter parody, Harry Potter and the Secret Chamber Pot of Azerbaijan. He appeared on a BBC4 programme in the guise of Nicholas Craig in 2007, in which he was interviewed by Mark Lawson.

Planer guest-starred in "The Pale Horse", a 2010 episode of Agatha Christie's Marple.   In 2011's The Hunt for Tony Blair, he played Peter Mandelson

Leading roles on television include Shine on Harvey Moon,  The Young Ones  Filthy Rich and Catflap, The Grimleys, King and Castle, Bonjour La Classe and Roll Over Beethoven.  He also starred in Michael Palin's Number 27, Simon Gray's Two Lumps of Ice, Emma Tennant's Frankenstein's Baby, Blackeyes by Dennis Potter, Marcella, Cockroaches, David Walliams' Ratburger and Loaded. 

Planer's guest appearances include programmes such as Inside Number 9,  The Bill, French and Saunders, Jonathan Creek, Blackadder III, The Last Detective, The Paul Merton Show, The Lenny Henry Show, Death in Paradise, Gary Wilmot's Songs from the Shows, This is Jinsy , Boomers,  Father Brown, M I High, Grantchester and There She Goes. Planer played Matt LeBlanc's lawyer in the TV series Episodes.

Theatre
His first break in the theatre was understudying David Essex as Che Guevara in the original West End run of Evita.

In 1990, he replaced Michael Gambon in Alan Ayckbourn's Man of the Moment in the West End. Leading roles followed in other productions at the Bush Theatre, the Lyric Theatre, the Traverse, the Young Vic, the West Yorkshire Playhouse, Regent's Park Open-Air Theatre, Chichester Festival Theatre, Plymouth Drum and the Hampstead Theatre.

Planer was in the original cast for the 1997 London revival of Chicago as Amos Hart. He was a member of the original West End cast of Ben Elton's Queen musical We Will Rock You as Pop.

In 2006, he played the part of the narrator in The Rocky Horror Show. He then starred as The Wizard in the original West End production of Wicked alongside Idina Menzel. The show opened at the Apollo Victoria Theatre on 27 September 2006. 

He took over the role of Wilbur, opposite Michael Ball, in the West End production of Hairspray on 2 February 2009.

He also featured in Doctor Who: Live touring the UK, as Vorgenson The Inter-Galactic Showman, before appearing in Pantomime as Captain Hook at the Lyceum Theatre in Sheffield.

Planer went on to star as Grandpa Joe in the original production of Charlie and the Chocolate Factory, which opened in London's West End in 2013 for which he was nominated for an Olivier Award for best supporting actor in a musical.

From September 2018 to November 2018, Planer toured with Ade Edmondson in a play that they wrote together called Vulcan 7.

In 2020 he took on the role of Grandpa in the arena tour of David Walliams' Grandpa's Great Escape.

Film
Planer has appeared in films, including Flood, Virgin Territory, Bright Young Things, Hogfather, The Colour of Magic, The Wind in the Willows, The Land Girls, Clockwork Mice, Carry On Columbus, Brazil, The Supergrass, I Give It a Year, Burn, Burn, Burn, The List and Yellowbeard.

Music
Planer played Den Dennis, one of the four members of the 1980s spoof rock band Bad News, which made two albums produced by Brian May. The band performed at the Hammersmith Apollo as well as the Donington and Reading Rock Festivals.

As Neil from The Young Ones, Planer gained a number two hit single in 1984 with "Hole in My Shoe" (originally a hit for 1960s band Traffic) winning him a Brit Award. After that, an album was produced by Dave Stewart, entitled Neil's Heavy Concept Album. Planer also took Neil's stage act on the road in that year as Neil in the "Bad Karma in The UK" tour. This culminated in a month-long run at the Edinburgh Festival Fringe and a night at The Hammersmith Apollo, London. The Young Ones also appeared on Cliff Richard's 1986 charity rerecording of "Living Doll", which spent three weeks at number one in the UK. He has a silver and a gold disc and a Brit award from his musical career. In 2015 he started a new music project called Rainsmoke with Chris Wade and Roger Planer.

In 2021, Planer released several of his own musical projects. "Five Songs Left" and "Four Songs More", collaborations with Chris Wade, are Nick Drake-inspired folk songs that he wrote in 1971, when he was eighteen. He also released two singles written more recently, "City in the Summer", a jazz song about the hot summer of COVID-19, and "Love Strikes". He has written lyrics for "Commit No Nuisance", a music collaboration with Neil Avery ("Talk it Out", one of the songs from the album, aims to encourage male mental health awareness,) and for Swedish rocker Matts Lindblom.

Voice acting
Planer was the reader of the first unabridged audiobook editions of many of Terry Pratchett's Discworld novels. He also appeared in the television adaptations of Terry Pratchett's Hogfather and The Colour of Magic, and performed as a voice artist in the games Discworld 2 and Discworld Noir. Discworld Audiobooks narrated by Planer include (with number in parentheses indicating order of the book in the Discworld series):
 The Colour of Magic (1)
 The Light Fantastic (2)
 Mort (4)
 Sourcery (5)
 Wyrd Sisters (6)
 Pyramids (7)
 Guards! Guards! (8)
 Moving Pictures (10)
 Reaper Man (11)
 Witches Abroad (12)
 Small Gods (13)
 Lords and Ladies (14)
 Men at Arms (15)
 Soul Music (16)
 Interesting Times (17)
 Maskerade (18)
 Feet of Clay (19)
 Hogfather (20)
 Jingo (21)
 The Last Continent (22)
 Carpe Jugulum (23)

Other voice roles include the narrator of Grizzly Tales for Gruesome Kids (and the audiobook narrator for Fearsome Tales for Fiendish Kids), for which he received a BAFTA nomination, the title character in 2 series of Romuald the Reindeer, and Dr. Marmalade in an episode of SpongeBob SquarePants (alongside Young Ones co-stars Christopher Ryan and Rik Mayall). Planer has also been the narrator of many of BBC Four's Britannia series of documentaries, including Prog Rock Britannia, Blues Britannia and Heavy Metal Britannia. In addition he voiced Frodo in The Adventures of Tom Bombadil from the 1992 radio series Tales from the Perilous Realm. He was a narrator in a direct-to-video version of Val Biro's Gumdrop book series in 1994. He narrated as a thirty-something Adrian Mole in the radio adaptation of Adrian Mole: The Cappuccino Years.

In 2018, he voiced the character of Henry Davenant Hythe in the Big Finish Productions original production, Jeremiah Bourne in Time, which he also wrote.

Writing
Planer has written books, stage plays, TV shows, radio plays and newspaper articles as well as 105 episodes of The New Magic Roundabout.

Books
 Neil’s Book of the Dead 1984 (with Terence Blacker)
 I an actor: Nicholas Craig 1988 (with Christopher Douglas)
 A Good Enough Dad 1992
 Let’s Get Divorced 1994 (with Terence Blacker)
 Therapy and How to Avoid it 1996 (with Robert Llewellyn)
 Unlike The Buddha 1997
 The Right Man 2000
 Faking It 2003
 Jeremiah Bourne in Time 2023

Plays
 On the Ceiling 2008
 Death of Long Pig 2009
 The Magnificent Andrea 2011
 Game of Love and Chai 2018
 Vulcan 7 2018 (with Adrian Edmondson)
 She Devil! (Workshop production) 2019
 All Above Board 2021

Credits
His television comedy and satire work includes:

 Boom Boom...Out Go The Lights (1981, TV Special) as Self
 Shine on Harvey Moon (1982–1995, TV Series) as Lou Lewis
 The Young Ones (1982–1984, TV Series) as Neil / E.T. Fairfax / Famine / Dino / Fly #2
 Yellowbeard (1983) as Mansell
 The Comic Strip Presents… (1983–2012, TV Series)
 Roll Over Beethoven (1985, TV Series) as Nigel Cochrane
 Brazil (1985) as Charlie – Dept. of Works
 King and Castle (1986–1988, TV Series) as David Castle
 Filthy Rich & Catflap (1987, TV Series) as Ralph Filthy
 Eat the Rich (1987) as DHSS Manager
 Blackadder the Third (1987) as Lord Smedley, fop
 Blackeyes (1989, TV Mini-Series, by Dennis Potter) as Jeff
 French & Saunders (1990, TV Series) as Andy
 Frankenstein's Baby (1990, TV Series) as Paul Hocking
 Nicholas Craig – The Naked Actor (1990–1992, TV Series) as Nicholas Craig
 Nicholas Craig's Interview Masterclass (1990, TV Series) as Nicholas Craig
 Oh, No! Not THEM! (1990, TV Movie) as Neil
 Nicholas Craig's Masterpiece Theatre (1992) as Nicholas Craig
 The Nicholas Craig Masterclass (1992) as Nicholas Craig
 Carry On Columbus (1992) as The Wazir
 The Magic Roundabout (1992, English adaptation and narrator on previously unseen episodes)
 Bonjour la Classe (1993, TV Series) as Laurence Didcott
 Sherlock Holmes (1993, TV Mini-Series) as Inspector Hopkins
 Let's Get Divorced (1994)
 Wake Up! With Libby And Jonathan (1994, TV Special short) as Jonathan Hughes
 Clockwork Mice (1995) as Parkey
 Diana & Me (1997) as Taxi Driver
 The Grimleys (1997–2001, TV Series) as Baz Grimley
 Jonathan Creek (1997–2013, TV Series) as Franklin Tartikoff / Shelford
 The Land Girls (1998) as Gerald
 Grizzly Tales for Gruesome Kids (2000–2007, TV Series) as Narrator (voice)
 Bright Young Things (2003) as Taxi Driver
 Wicked (2006–2008, West End Musical)
 SpongeBob SquarePants (2006) – Dr. Marmalade (voice)
 Terry Pratchett's Hogfather (2006, TV Movie) as Mr. Sideney
 Flood (2007) as Keith Hopkins
 Virgin Territory (2007) as Uncle Bruno
 Terry Pratchett's The Colour of Magic (2008, TV Mini-Series) as Arch Astronomer
 Hairspray (2009)
 M.I.High (2009, TV Series) as Prime Minister
 Episodes (2012–2015, TV Series) as Sanford Shamiro
 I Give It a Year (2013) as Brian
 The List (2013) as Ted Rove
 Charlie and the Chocolate Factory (musical) (2013)
 Boomers (2014–2016, TV Series) as Mick
 Cockroaches (2015, TV Series) as Stevie
 Burn Burn Burn (2015) as Henry
 Grantchester (2016, TV Series) as Giles Montgomery
 Seven Days in Never (2017) (voice)
 Ratburger (2017, TV Movie) as Headmaster
 Loaded (2017, TV Series) as Mr. Young
 Death in Paradise (2018, TV Series) as Eugene Sutton
 Inside No. 9 (2018, TV Series) as Frank
 Marcella (2018, TV Series) as Reg Reynolds
 Vulcan 7 (2018)
 There She Goes (2018–2020, TV Series) as Gandalf
 Father Brown (2019, TV Series) as Ronnie Grunion
 Grandpa’s Great Escape Arena Tour (2019)
 Lockwood & Co. (2023, TV Series) as Sir John Fairfax

Discography
 Evita (Original London Cast Recording) 1978
 "Hole in My Shoe" (1984)
 Neil's Heavy Concept Album (1984)
 Rollover Beethoven. (Songs from the original TV series) 1985
 "Living Doll" (1986)
 Rough with the Smooth( 1986)
 Bad News (1987)
 Bad News Bootleg (1988)
 Bad News The Cash in Compilation (1992)
 The Last Night (1993)
 Chicago cast recording (1995)
 The Dreaded Lurgie (1998)
 Three Men in a Boat (1999)
 Adrian Mole the Cappuccino Years (2000)
 There was also a soundtrack to The Grimleys (2000), Planer's character appearing on the album.
 We Will Rock You (The Original London Cast Recording) (2002)
 Cabaret (2005)
 The Robe of Skulls (2008)
 Charlie and the Chocolate Factory (The Original London Cast Recording) (2013)
 Five Songs Left (2020)
 City in the Summer (2020) – single
 Four Songs More (2021)
 Love Strikes (2021) – single
 Phoning Home From Away (2021) – single
 The Last Ten Yards (2021) – single

References

External links
 
 
  September 2006 article about Planer
 
  as Neil

1953 births
Living people
20th-century English comedians
20th-century English male actors
20th-century English male writers
20th-century English novelists
21st-century English comedians
21st-century English male actors
21st-century English male writers
21st-century English novelists
Alumni of the London Academy of Music and Dramatic Art
Alumni of the University of Sussex
Audiobook narrators
English dramatists and playwrights
English male comedians
English male dramatists and playwrights
English male film actors
English male novelists
English male singers
English male stage actors
English male television actors
English male voice actors
Fathers' rights activists
People educated at Westminster School, London
People from Westminster
The Comic Strip
English people of Hungarian descent